Marie Saxon (1904 - November 12, 1941) was an American actress in vaudeville and theatre, who briefly appeared in film.

Pauline Marie Landry was born in Lawrence, Massachusetts. Her family were entertainers; her mother was vaudeville comedienne Pauline Saxon and her father, Daniel Landry, was a theatre manager.

Saxon embarked upon a career in musical theatre at 15. She performed in vaudeville, teaming with her mother in an act billed as the Saxon Sisters, before acting in stage musicals. She performed in Broadway musicals including My Girl (1924), The Ramblers (1926), Ups-A-Daisy (1928), Battling Butter (1923), and Merry, Merry (1925). She was both a stage and film actress.

Saxon's films included Broadway Hoofer (1930).

Saxon married Sidne Silverman, the publisher of Variety, an entertainment publication founded by his father, Sime Silverman, on May 31, 1924. They had a son, Syd Silverman, and they resided in Harrison, New York. Saxon died in Harrison on November 12, 1941, at age 37.

References

External links
Marie Saxon on IMDb

1904 births
1941 deaths
People from Lawrence, Kansas
People from Harrison, New York
20th-century American actresses
American stage actresses
Vaudeville performers
Silverman family